Captain Robert George Wilmot Berkeley DL (23 April 1898 – 28 August 1969) was High Sheriff of Worcestershire in 1933, and Deputy Lieutenant of the county in 1952;
he also appeared four times in first-class cricket for Worcestershire County Cricket Club. He lived at Berkeley Castle and Spetchley Park.

Life

Berkeley was educated at Downside and The Oratory School,
and served with the Westminster Dragoons in Palestine and on the Western Front in the First World War;
he also served in the Second World War,
and was promoted to captain while serving with the Royal Artillery.
In 1923 he was made deputy master of the Berkeley Hunt, and from 1928 until his death was joint master.

Cricket

Berkeley played four first-class games for Worcestershire shortly after the First World War. Only one of these, against Northamptonshire in 1922, was in the County Championship.
He had very little success in any of his first-class matches, although he did score 138 in a minor game for Gentlemen of Worcestershire against Gentlemen of Suffolk in 1933.

Family

In 1927 he married the Hon Myrtle Dormer, daughter of the 14th Baron Dormer; they had three children.

Berkeley died in a nursing home in Bristol.

Notes

References
 
 

1898 births
1969 deaths
British Army personnel of World War I
British Army personnel of World War II
Deputy Lieutenants of Worcestershire
English cricketers
Worcestershire cricketers
People educated at Downside School
People educated at The Oratory School
Royal Artillery officers
High Sheriffs of Worcestershire
Westminster Dragoons officers